Gabriel Howard Paul (January 4, 1910 – April 26, 1998) was an American executive in Major League Baseball who, between 1951 and 1984, served as general manager of the Cincinnati Reds, Houston Colt .45s, Cleveland Indians and New York Yankees. He also was president and part-owner of the Indians and president and limited partner of the Yankees.

Early life and career
Born in Rochester, New York, and of Jewish descent, Paul got his start in the game at age ten as a batboy for the Rochester Tribe of the AA International League and later attended Monroe High School. Eventually, he worked for Warren Giles, who became business manager of the renamed Rochester Red Wings when the St. Louis Cardinals purchased the team in 1928. When Giles took over the front office of the Cincinnati Reds in 1937, Paul became the Reds’ traveling secretary.

After returning from military service during World War II, Paul was promoted to vice president.

Cincinnati Reds general manager
In October 1951, when Giles was elected president of the National League, Paul took his old mentor's job as Cincinnati general manager. The Reds were then a losing outfit with a weak farm system. Paul rebuilt the minor league department and began to scout and sign African-American and Latin American players. Cincinnati broke the baseball color line on April 17, 1954, when Nino Escalera and Chuck Harmon made their debuts. Cincinnati became the seventh of the eight National League clubs to integrate; the eighth, the Philadelphia Phillies, would insert their first black player into their lineup on April 22, 1957.

In  at age 20, Frank Robinson, the club's first black superstar, had the best rookie season in NL history, hitting 38 home runs, scoring a league-leading 122 runs, and compiling an OPS of .936. In , Cincinnati unveiled another star African-American player, rookie outfielder Vada Pinson, who would enjoy a long MLB career and, with Robinson, help lead the 1961 Reds to the National League pennant. Paul also signed a working agreement with the Havana Sugar Kings of the Triple-A International League, giving the team access to top Cuban talent such as shortstop Leo Cárdenas and future "Big Red Machine" icon Tony Pérez.  In addition, the Reds produced Cuban stars such as outfielder Tony González, second baseman Cookie Rojas, and pitcher Mike Cuellar—among many others—who made their mark with other MLB clubs.

The Cincinnati team of the mid-1950s—then temporarily nicknamed the Redlegs because of the anti-communism of the time—captured the country's imagination as a team of sluggers. With a lineup that included Robinson, Ted Kluszewski, Gus Bell, Wally Post and Ed Bailey, the 1956 Redlegs hit 221 home runs, tying the major-league team record then in place. They also won 91 games to finish third, only two games behind the pennant-winning Brooklyn Dodgers. Paul was named Executive of the Year by The Sporting News. The following year, Baseball Commissioner Ford Frick had to intervene when Cincinnati fans "stuffed" the ballot box and elected a virtually all-Redleg starting lineup to the National League All-Star team.

The Reds failed to improve upon their 1956 mark during Paul's tenure, however, and after a disappointing 1960 season, Paul resigned to become the first general manager of the expansion Houston Colt .45s.

Houston Colt .45s/Cleveland Indians executive
Paul brought to Houston key Cincinnati executives or scouts Tal Smith, Bill Giles, Bobby Mattick and Paul Florence, and began to lay the foundation for the team's 1962 debut, but he did not stay long. He clashed with co-owner Roy Hofheinz and reportedly received a standing offer from the Cleveland Indians to take over their front office, following the January 1961 resignation of Frank Lane. In late April 1961, Paul returned to Ohio to assume command of the Indians, leaving the Colt .45s almost 12 months before the team ever played an official game.

The Indians of the early 1960s were a middle-echelon team in the American League that had contended for a pennant only twice ( and ) since its 1954 AL title. It had lost its most popular gate attraction, slugger Rocky Colavito, in a Lane-engineered trade just before the  season and the young players summoned from the team's farm system failed to capture the city's imagination. On November 26, 1962, Paul became a part-owner, as well as president, treasurer and general manager. Some sources describe him as replacing William R. Daley as principal owner. In truth, at the same time Paul bought into the Indians, Daley remained chairman and recruited a number of new investors who saw him as head of the franchise. The Indians continued to tread water in the standings and struggled badly at the gate. On multiple occasions, the Indians were rumored to be headed elsewhere. In 1964, the club's board of directors authorized Paul to investigate transferring the Indians to one of three cities: Oakland, Dallas or Seattle. But a new stadium lease with the city of Cleveland staved off the move. Two years later, Daley sold the team to frozen food magnate Vernon Stouffer, who retained Paul as general manager.

On the field, Paul brought to Cleveland pitching stars Sam McDowell and Luis Tiant and, in 1965, reacquired Colavito in a bid to win more games, and more fans. But, after an encouraging 1968 season, the Indians plummeted in the standings. For a while, between 1969 and 1971, Paul gave up most of his powers to field manager Alvin Dark in an effort to change the club's fortunes.

New York Yankees club president/general manager
Finally, in 1973, Paul sold his interest in the Indians and became part of George Steinbrenner's Cleveland-based syndicate that purchased the Yankees from CBS. Installed as club president that year after the April departure of minority owner E. Michael Burke and the year-end election of GM/interim president Lee MacPhail to the presidency of the American League, Paul helped Steinbrenner rebuild the once-proud Yankees into a champion. In , Paul was selected MLB Executive of the Year for the second time in his career, as the Yankees finished second in the American League East Division and improved by nine games from the  edition.  Then, the Bombers won their first American League pennant in 12 years in 1976 and first world championship since 1962 the following year.

The key to re-building the Yankees was a series of trades that Paul pulled off.  Paul raised some eyebrows among Cleveland fans because less than two months before he became a part of the group purchasing the Yankees and assumed the role of President for the Yankees, he dealt All-Star third baseman Graig Nettles and catcher Gerry Moses to the New York Yankees for a group of journeyman players.  Then he acquired in succession: Chris Chambliss, Dick Tidrow and Oscar Gamble from his former team, the Indians; Lou Piniella from the Royals; Mickey Rivers and Ed Figueroa from the Angels; Willie Randolph, Ken Brett and Dock Ellis from the Pirates; and Bucky Dent from the White Sox. He also signed Catfish Hunter and Reggie Jackson as free agents.

Paul, whose nickname was the "Smiling Cobra" for his expertise in trades, had his enemies, among them influential Cleveland radio host Pete Franklin, who said of Paul, "Gabe was a master at working the room, of getting to know everybody and knowing where all the bodies are. The thing about Gabe was that while he did work for an owner, he always found a way to get a piece of the team himself. Then it became damn near impossible to fire him because he was part-owner. Gabe's greatest gift was the ability to take care of Gabe." The Yankees were able to beat the Los Angeles Dodgers in the 1977 World Series, Paul's only World Series victory as a general manager.

The 1977 season, however, was Paul's last in the Bronx.

Return to the Cleveland Indians
After Al Rosen was brought into the Bronx as a senior executive in fall 1977—crowding Paul's authority much as Paul's presence did Mike Burke—Paul returned to Cleveland as president of the Indians in 1978. But he could never rouse the Tribe from their doldrums. From 1978 to 1984, the Indians would have a winning record just twice (1979, 1981) while never finishing above 5th in the American League East Division, and Paul retired after the 1984 season, having spent nearly six decades involved with baseball.

He died at the age of 88 in Tampa, Florida. His son Gabe Jr. was also a baseball executive, serving the Milwaukee Brewers in a number of capacities, including vice president/operations, from 1970–1997.

Paul was played by Kevin Conway in the 2007 ESPN television mini-series The Bronx Is Burning.

References

External links
Baseball Hall of Fame – 2008 Veterans Committee candidate profile

Gabe Paul – Baseball Biography and Highlights

1910 births
1998 deaths
American military personnel of World War II
Cincinnati Reds executives
Cleveland Indians executives
Cleveland Indians owners
Houston Colt .45s executives
Jewish American baseball people
Major League Baseball executives
Major League Baseball general managers
Major League Baseball team presidents
New York Yankees executives
People from Rochester, New York
20th-century American Jews